Abdou Boinaheri Mchinda (born 12 October 1988) is footballer who plays for French team FC Côte Bleue, as a midfielder. Born in France, he represents Comoros at international level.

Career
Born in Marseille, Boinaheri has played for Evian Thonon Gaillard B, Aubagne and FC Côte Bleue.

He made his international debut for Comoros in 2016.

References

1988 births
Living people
Citizens of Comoros through descent
Comorian footballers
Comoros international footballers
French footballers
French sportspeople of Comorian descent
Thonon Evian Grand Genève F.C. players
Aubagne FC players
Division d'Honneur players
Championnat National 3 players
Association football midfielders